Oskar Brajter (30 May 1929 – 27 November 2004) was a Polish footballer. He played in two matches for the Poland national football team from 1931 to 1936.

References

External links
 
 

1929 births
2004 deaths
Polish footballers
Poland international footballers
Sportspeople from Chorzów
Association football forwards
Ruch Chorzów players
Legia Warsaw players